Shower of Stars (also known as Chrysler Shower of Stars) is an American variety television series broadcast live in the United States from 1954 to 1958 by CBS. The series was broadcast in color which was a departure from the usual CBS  programming practices of the 1950s.

Overview
Shower of Stars is typically composed of musical comedy revues with an occasional straight play.  It was shown on approximately a monthly basis during its run (1954-1958), and was designed to contrast with the heavy dramatic content of the program with which it shared its timeslot, Climax!  Both programs were sponsored by Chrysler Corporation, and both were hosted by William Lundigan.

Famous entertainers of the era who appeared multiple times on Shower of Stars included Jack Benny, Bob Crosby, Betty Grable, Van Johnson, Shirley MacLaine, Fredric March, Frankie Laine, Ethel Merman, Basil Rathbone, Red Skelton, Mario Lanza and Ed Wynn Liberace.  March and Rathbone starred as Ebenezer Scrooge and Jacob Marley, respectively, in a 1954 musical adaptation of Charles Dickens's A Christmas Carol, with songs by Bernard Herrmann and Maxwell Anderson. This was the first musical version of the story to be televised, and the first in color. Rathbone would go on to play Scrooge himself, in another TV musical adaptation of the story, the 1956 version of The Stingiest Man in Town. (Rathbone would again play Scrooge in a 1958 non-musical British half-hour television version of the story, with Fredric March as narrator.) The most frequently-appearing artist, however, was Jack Benny, who appeared in one role or another in a majority of the program's broadcasts.

Awards and nominations

Episode status
The extant episodes of Shower of Stars have survived only in black-and-white kinescopes of the original color broadcasts, which have been lost. The episodes carry no copyright notice and are thus in the public domain in the United States. The Internet Archive holds seven episodes in its collection.

References

External links

 

1954 American television series debuts
1958 American television series endings
1950s American variety television series
CBS original programming
English-language television shows
American live television series
Television series by CBS Studios
Television series by Desilu Productions